Epting is a surname. Notable people with the surname include:

Christopher Epting (born 1946), American Episcopal bishop
Steve Epting (born 1963), American comics artist

See also
Eptingen